Thailand competed with five athletes at the 2020 Winter Youth Olympics in Lausanne, Switzerland from 9 to 22 January 2020.

Thailand made it Winter Youth Olympics debut.

Alpine skiing

Cross-country skiing 

Boys

Girls

Short track speed skating

Boys

See also
Thailand at the 2020 Summer Olympics

References

2020 in Thai sport
Nations at the 2020 Winter Youth Olympics
Thailand at the Youth Olympics